Artur Jorge Colaço Futre (born 29 April 1983) is a Portuguese former footballer who played as an attacking midfielder.

Club career
Born in Montijo, Setúbal District, Futre spent most of his youth career at Sporting CP, joining their youth system at the age of nine. In 2003–04 he made his Primeira Liga debut, playing 30 minutes for F.C. Alverca in a 0–1 home loss against C.S. Marítimo on 22 August 2003; the Lisbon side had just returned from the second division, and would be immediately relegated at the end of the season.

Futre was bought by S.L. Benfica in the summer of 2005, but never played any competitive matches for the club, serving two loans in the process, the first in the second tier with F.C. Maia and the second in the top flight with lowly C.D. Aves, featuring scarcely for the latter team. Subsequently, he chose to retire at only 24, going on to work as a promoter of sporting events.

Futre returned to active in 2008–09 after one year away from the game, moving to local Clube Olímpico do Montijo in the regional championships. Three years later, he retired for the second and definitive time.

Personal life
Futre's uncle, Paulo, also came through Sporting's youth academy, going on to have an illustrious professional career, playing for FC Porto and Atlético Madrid as the most notable clubs.

References

External links

1983 births
Living people
People from Montijo, Portugal
Portuguese footballers
Association football midfielders
Primeira Liga players
Liga Portugal 2 players
F.C. Alverca players
S.L. Benfica footballers
F.C. Maia players
C.D. Aves players
Clube Olímpico do Montijo players
Portugal youth international footballers
Sportspeople from Setúbal District